Erechthias chasmatias is a species of moth in the family Tineidae. It was described by Edward Meyrick in 1880 using two male specimens taken in forest in Wellington in January. This species is endemic to New Zealand.  It has been found in the Wellington Botanic Garden.

References

External links
Image of specimen of Erechthias chasmatias

Moths described in 1880
Erechthiinae
Moths of New Zealand
Endemic fauna of New Zealand
Taxa named by Edward Meyrick
Endemic moths of New Zealand